William Butler (8 November 1871 – 19 August 1953) was a New Zealand cricketer and Test cricket umpire.

Butler was born and died in Dunedin, where he attended Christian Brothers' High School. He made a single first-class appearance for Otago during the 1901–02 season, against Hawke's Bay. Opening the batting, he scored two runs in the only innings in which he batted, as Otago won the match by an innings.

Between 1921 and 1937, Butler umpired eighteen first-class matches in New Zealand and two Test matches. He umpired the first Test match ever played by New Zealand, in Christchurch in January 1930. Professionally Butler was a bookmaker.

References

1871 births
1953 deaths
Cricketers from Dunedin
New Zealand cricketers
Otago cricketers
New Zealand Test cricket umpires
Burials at Andersons Bay Cemetery
People educated at Trinity Catholic College, Dunedin